Pershing is the second full-length studio album from American indie pop band Someone Still Loves You Boris Yeltsin. It was released through Polyvinyl Records on April 8, 2008.

Background and production

The album's name refers to John J. Pershing Middle School in Springfield, Missouri, which Philip Dickey attended.

The track "HEERS" references the Heers Building which is also located in Springfield, Missouri.

The album's production is more refined than the lo-fi Broom, but retains the doubled vocals, moving bass lines, and clean guitar lines played by electric and acoustic guitars from the former album.

The album is dedicated to the bands' lifelong friend, Alex Bethurem, a Chicago area indie music fan (originally from Springfield, MO), who took his own life.

A pre-order edition of the album featured exclusive original artwork and three bonus tracks.  The first two are demo acoustic songs: an early draft of The Beach Song, I Didn't Mean it; and Stain, a cover of the Nirvana song.

Reception

The album received internet buzz as well as favorable online reviews on indie music blogs. Taylor from the music blog Music for Ants said "It’s got that jangly pop that fans have grown to love, and the melodies are still top-notch." One Amazon.com customer review describes it as "Quirky chord changes amid massive hooks and addictive melodies."

On the other side, Pitchfork gave the album a 6.2/10, stating "Pershing is so easy-going it tends to forget trying to be memorable." AllMusic gave Pershing 2.5/5.0 stars, calling it "a boring, careless record that tries too hard to be witty and hooky, resulting in something that resembles the indie-hipster version of the nameless college-guy jam band."

Track listing
 "Glue Girls" - 3:26
 "Boring Fountain" - 3:44
 "Dead Right" - 2:21
 "The Beach Song" - 2:48
 "Modern Mystery" - 4:20
 "Some Constellation" - 3:12
 "Think I Wanna Die" - 2:49
 "You Could Write a Book" - 3:13
 "Oceanographer" - 4:45
 "HEERS" - 3:26
 "Doris Tailspin (Boring Mountain)" - 0:56

Personnel
The band members are credited as follows.

John Robert Cardwell - vocals, guitar, bass, trumpet, belly charms
Philip Dickey - vocals, guitar, drums, piano
Jonathan James - drums, bass, guitar, piano, synth, crystals
Will Knauer - guitar

Additional musicians
Brian Azevedo — acoustic guitar on Oceanographer
Molly Healey — strings on Dead Right
Becky Thomas — hand claps on Dead Right, cowbell on Glue Girls

Production
 Recorded and mixed by SSLYBY and Jason Spell between March 2007 at Fred's Loft in Wilmington, N.C. and from August to December 2007 in Springfield, MO.
 Engineered by Jonathan James
 Mastered by TW Walsh

References

External links
Official preview of Think I Wanna Die, from Polyvinyl
 made by the band; from Daytrotter

2008 albums
Someone Still Loves You Boris Yeltsin albums